Mary Liz Holberg (born November 13, 1959) is a Minnesota politician, member of the Dakota County, Minnesota Board of Commissioners, and former member of the Minnesota House of Representatives. A member of the Republican Party of Minnesota, she represented District 58A, which encompasses most of the city of Lakeville in Dakota County.

Minnesota House of Representatives
She was first elected in 1998, and was re-elected every two years until her retirement in 2015. Prior to the 2002 legislative redistricting, she represented the old District 37B.

She was an assistant majority leader during the 2001–02 session. She chaired the House Civil Law Committee during the 2003–04 session, and the House Transportation Finance Committee during the 2005–06 session.

On November 20, 2003, Holberg and then State Senator Michele Bachmann proposed a constitutional amendment that would define marriage as one man and one woman.

On May 21, 2011, she joined the House Republican majority in voting for a constitutional amendment to define marriage as between a man and woman.

Holberg announced on February 22, 2014 that she would not be seeking re-election.

References

External links

Rep. Mary Liz Holberg official Minnesota House of Representatives website
Mary Liz Holberg official campaign website
Minnesota Public Radio Votetracker: Rep. Mary Liz Holberg
Project Votesmart - Rep. Mary Liz Holberg Profile

Living people
1959 births
People from Lakeville, Minnesota
Republican Party members of the Minnesota House of Representatives
Women state legislators in Minnesota
21st-century American politicians
21st-century American women politicians